Cavernularia elegans is a species of coral in the family Veretillidae found in the North Atlantic Ocean.

References

External links 
 marinespecies (retrieved 22 July 2016)
 eol (retrieved 22 July 2016)

Veretillidae
Corals described in 1858